The Wildwater Canoeing World Cup is an annual series of races in wildwater canoeing held under the auspices of the International Canoe Federation. It has been held since 1989 in four canoe and kayak disciplines for men and women. The four original disciplines were men's single canoe (C1), men's double canoe (C2), men's kayak (K1) and women's kayak.

Competition format
Each edition has six races to assign the cup in three events, each race has two races.

World Cup Champions

K1 and C1 men and women; C2 men

C2 women

See also 
 Canoe World Cup
 Canoe Slalom World Cup
 Wildwater Canoeing World Championships

Notes

References

External links 
 

World Cup